Brousses is part of the name of the following communes in France:

 Brousses-et-Villaret, in the Aude department
 Revest-des-Brousses, in the Alpes-de-Haute-Provence department
 Saint-Maurice-les-Brousses, in the Haute-Vienne department

See also
Brousse (disambiguation)